Steve Martin (born 1945) is an American actor and comedian.

Steve Martin may also refer to:
 Steve Martin (defensive tackle) (born 1974), former American football player for several teams, 1996–2004
 Steve Martin (defensive end) (born 1964), former American football defensive end for the Washington Redskins, 1987
 Steve Martin (motorcyclist) (born 1968), superbike rider
 Steve Martin (Virginia politician) (born 1956), Virginia state senator
 Steve Martin (rugby league) (born 1957), Australian rugby league footballer and coach
 Steve Martin (sportscaster) (born 1952), American sportscaster
 Steve Martin (Australian politician) (born 1960), Australian politician
 Steve Martin (Western Australian politician), member of the Western Australian parliament
 Steve Martin (British academic) (born 1961), director of the Wales Centre for Public Policy
 Steve Burnett-Martin, also known as Blacker Dread, British record store owner
 Steve Martin, a reporter played by Raymond Burr in both the 1956 film Godzilla, King of the Monsters! and the 1985 film Godzilla 1985, part of the Godzilla franchise

See also
 Stephen Martin (disambiguation)
 Steve Martini (born 1946), American novelist
 Steven Martini (born 1975), entertainment personality
 Steve Martins (born 1972), hockey player
 Steve Martin Caro (1948–2020), lead singer for The Left Banke
 Steve Martino (born 1959), American director and designer